The 2019–20 Svenska Cupen was the 64th season of the Svenska Cupen and the eighth season with the current format. The eventual champions, IFK Göteborg, secured a place in the second qualifying round of the 2020–21 UEFA Europa League. A total of 96 clubs entered the competition, 64 teams from district sites and 32 from the Allsvenskan and the Superettan.

The first rounds were played between 1 May and 6 June 2019. The first round draw was announced on 25 April 2019. Times up to October 2019 and from 31 March 2020 are CEST (UTC+2). Times from 28 October 2019 to 30 March 2020 are CET (UTC+1).

The tournament was suspended before the quarterfinals due to the COVID-19 pandemic. On 18 June 2020, following the UEFA's publication of its intended dates for the 2020–21 UEFA Europa League (for which the winner of the Svenska Cupen qualifies) on 17 June 2020, the Swedish football association announced that the 2019–20 Svenska Cupen would resume play, with quarterfinals played on 25 June 2020, semi-finals on 9 July 2020 and the final on 30 July 2020. All remaining games were to be played without any attendance and with the additional rules adopted by the Swedish football association following the pandemic, which included inter alia that all teams are allowed to make five substitutions during one game.

Round and draw dates
The schedule of the competition is as follows.

Teams

Round 1

64 teams from the third tier or lower of the Swedish league system competed in this round.

Round 2
64 teams will compete in this round: 32 winners from Round 1 and the 32 teams from the 2019 Allsvenskan and 2019 Superettan.  All games will be played on August 21–22, 2019.

Seeding

Matches

Group stage
The 32 winners from round 2 will be divided into eight groups of four teams. The 16 highest ranked winners from the previous rounds will be seeded to the top two positions in each group and the 16 remaining winners will be unseeded in the draw. The ranking of the 16 seeded teams will be decided by league position in the 2019 season. All teams in the group stage will play each other once, the highest-ranked teams from the previous rounds and teams from tier three or lower will have the right to play two home matches.

Group 1

Group 2

Group 3

Group 4

Group 5

Group 6

Group 7

Group 8

Knockout stage

Qualified teams

Bracket

Quarter-finals

Semi-finals

Final

References

Svenska Cupen seasons
Cupen
Cupen
Sweden
Svenska Cupen